Plast is a town and the administrative center of Plastovsky District in Chelyabinsk Oblast, Russia, located on the eastern slopes of the Ural Mountains in the upper basin of the Uy River,  southwest of Chelyabinsk, the administrative center of the oblast. Population:

History
It was founded as a gold mine in the mid-19th century. Town status was granted to it on October 7, 1940.

Administrative and municipal status
Within the framework of administrative divisions, Plast serves as the administrative center of Plastovsky District. As an administrative division, it is, together with one rural locality (the khutor of Pchelnik), incorporated within Plastovsky District as the Town of Plast. As a municipal division, the Town of Plast is incorporated within Plastovsky Municipal District as Plastovskoye Urban Settlement.

Сlimate
A temperate continental climate.
July is the warmest month of the year, its average temperature is 19.2 ° C, and the coldest month is January with an average temperature of -16.5 ° C.
The average annual rainfall is 445 mm.

Sport
The interest for bandy has been resumed and the team Metallurg participated in 2015 in the championship for Chelyabinsk Oblast for boys born 2000-02.

Stadium "Trud"
Stadium "Trud" is the central place where citizens do sports. The stadium includes a football field, a basketball court, a gym, a playground, an ice rink and tribunes. All sports events are hosted there in front of people. One of the most popular activity here is football, so many teams come from surrounding villages to fight for a cup. There is also a stage where Nikolai Baskov performed on City Day in 2019. Thanks to this place, the citizens lead healthy lives.

Landmarks
On the Krasnoarmeyskaya street opposite the cinema named after A.S. Pushkin is a monument to the prospector, who, according to the creators, immortalized the history of creation and the name of the city. It is dedicated to the discoverers of the Kochkarsky gold deposit, the first prospectors and geologists. The monument was opened in 2014. Its authors are sculptors A.V. Ryabov and K.A. Gelev. Alexander Ryabov created the image of a prospector from old photographs. 

In 2016, a monument to Peter and Fevronia of Murom was erected. The monument has become a traditional wedding place of the district – on the wedding day the newlyweds ask the saints to make their marriage happy.

On July 11, the grand opening of the sculptural composition of St. Barbara the Great Martyr took place. The Christian great martyr is considered the protector of sudden and violent death.
 Grand opening of the monument to St. Barbara the Great Martyr
The sculptural composition “The Holy Great Martyr Barbara, the patroness of miner's labor” was installed on the highest point of the city. The appearance of this monument on the territory of the city-forming enterprise is not accidental. Saint Barbara the Great Martyr received great grace from God - to deliver from the sudden death of everyone who remembers her own martyrdom. She is considered the patroness of miners. The mothers and wives pray for the intercession of Barbara, and the miners themselves turn to her in difficult times. The installation of the monument was a great gift for the 20th anniversary of the city-forming enterprise, as well as for all workers of the mine and residents of the Plastovsky district.

References

Notes

Sources

Cities and towns in Chelyabinsk Oblast